Thorbjørn Harr (born 24 May 1974) is a Norwegian actor.

Background 
Harr was discovered in a schoolyard by NRK people who were scouting for actors for youth series.

Career 
He soon became a familiar face on programs like Blikkbåx and U and also appeared in the popular 1991 television movie Frida – med hjertet i hånden. He later had minor roles in Lille Lørdag in 1995 and a major role in the mini-series Lekestue broadcast on NRK in 2002. His real film debut came in 2003 in  Mot Moskva, where he played the leading role of Vassi and was nominated for an Amanda Award, and in 2005 he appeared in Venner for livet. He played the lead role of Mathias in Mars & Venus (2007). He played Jarl Borg in History's Vikings. Beginning in 2000, he has also appeared in several stage productions. With comedian Harald Eia and two others, he runs Teatersport Oslo. More recently, he has had a recurring role in the American comedy-drama TV series Younger, playing the love interest of a character played by Hilary Duff.

Stage
Shortly after graduating from the Norwegian National Academy of Theatre in 2000, Harr joined the National Theatre in Oslo. He has appeared there as Håkon Håkonsson in Ibsen's The Pretenders and as the young Speer in the production of the same name. He has played Figaro in Beaumarchais' The Marriage of Figaro, Erhart in John Gabriel Borkman, and Tom in The Glass Menagerie. He has appeared in many productions by Jo Strømgren, including There, which won the 2002 Hedda Award for best play.  he had appeared in almost 20 National Theatre productions.

Filmography
1991 Frida – Straight from the Heart (film for television, also released in theaters)
2003 Mot Moskva, as Vassi
2005 Venner for livet, as Roger
2005 Thomas Hylland Eriksen og historien om origamijenta, as Anders
2006 Overlap
2006 Reprise, as Mathis Wergeland
2007 Mars & Venus, as Mathias
2008 De gales hus, as Stetson
2010 Olsenbanden Jr. Mestertyvens skatt, as manager of retirement home
2012 Inn i mørket, as Jan 
2013 Frozen, Norwegian-language version, voice of Kristoff
2016 The Last King, as Inge Bårdsson
2018 22 July, as Sveinn Are Hanssen
2019 The Tunnel
2020 Togo, as Charlie Olsen
2020 Cadaver, as Mathias

TV
1995 Lillelørdag, as Bærumsoss
1997 Tre på toppen
2001 Fox Grønland, as Thomas Heistad (1 episode)
2002 Lekestue, as Kjell

2006 Gutta Boys as Arne's father
2008 Hvaler, as dental patient

2013 Vikings, as Jarl Borg
2015 Younger, as Anton Bjornberg (Recurring Role)
2018 Kielergata, as Jonas Schulman/Stefan
2020 Norsemen, as Jarl Bjorn

Audiobooks
2007 Johan Harstad, DARLAH
2008 Jo Nesbø, Hodejegerne

Awards
2005: Per Aabel prize
2009/10: Norwegian Theatre Critics Award, for Chet spiller ikke her.
2011: Blue Bird prize of the NRK Radio Theatre, for Chet spiller ikke her and Hvitvasking.

Personal life
Harr married Tai Victoria Grung in 2006; they have three children.

References

External links

Thorbjørn Harr at Filmweb
Roles at National Theatre of Norway

1974 births
Living people
20th-century Norwegian male actors
Oslo National Academy of the Arts alumni
Place of birth missing (living people)
21st-century Norwegian male actors
Norwegian male film actors
Norwegian male stage actors
Norwegian male television actors
Norwegian male voice actors